Muhammad Rasool (born May 23, 1985) is a Pakistani footballer who currently plays for K-Electric as a forward.

Rasool won the league with K-Electric in 2014–15 season. Rasool finished season twice as the top scorer, first with Khan Research Laboratories in 2008–09 and with K-Electric 2014–15, scoring 22 goals in 26 games and 22 goals in 22 games respectively.

Early career
Rasool started playing football at an early age and later played for the College football team, he captained the college team and helped them win Khyber Pakhtunkhwa (formerly NWFP) inter-colleges and inter-board tournaments. Later he also played for All Pakistan Universities team and participated in the National Championship in 2004. He is currently representing Chitral falcon

Club career

Khan Research Laboratories
2006–07
Rasool joined Khan Research Laboratories in the 2006–07 season. Rasool scored his first league goal on 14 December 2006 against Wohaib, scoring the opening goal on the 34th minutes in a 3–0 victory. On 19 January 2007, Rasool scored the winner for Khan Research Laboratories against National Bank, scoring in 66th minutes as Khan Research Laboratories won the game 2–1. Rasool ended the season with 2 goals in 16 appearances.

2007–08
Rasool scored his team's fourth goal in the opening match of 2007–08 season in a 4–0 win over Wohaib. On 3 November 2007, Rasool scored the only goal of the match on 18th minutes as Khan Research Laboratories defeated PMC Athletico 1–0. Rasool scored against Pakistan Television on 11 November 2007, scoring the opening goal in 2nd minute of the game. On 26 December 2007, Rasool scored his first hat-trick against National Bank, scoring in 4th, 42nd and 49th minutes. In the first game of 2008 on 1 January 2008, Rasool scored a brace in a 2–0 win over Karachi Port Trust, Rasool scored in 31st and 80th minutes, taking his tally to 8 goals, as Rasool ended season with 8 goals in 26 appearances.

2008–09
The 2008–09 season was the breakthrough season for Rasool, as he won the golden boot after scoring 22 goals in 26 appearances for the club. Rasool started his campaign with a hat-trick against Karachi Electric Supply Corporation scoring in 37th, 42nd and 56th minutes, as Khan Research Laboratories won the game by 5–1. On 17 August 2008, Rasool scored a brace against Pakistan Airlines in a 2–0, finding the net in 11th and 61st minutes. Rasool scored another brace against WAPDA on 27 August 2008. After scoring 7 goals in 8 matches in the month of August, Rasool was unable to find the net until 14 October, as he scored the third goal for Khan Research Laboratories on 77th minute in a 3–0 win over Pakistan Television. On 23 October, Rasool scored his second hat-trick of the season against Pakistan Television, completing his hat-trick in 25 minutes, scoring his first in 60th minutes, second in 70th minutes and third in 85th minutes. Rasool scored a brace against Pakistan Army in a 2–0 victory. On 29 October, Rasool scored the only goal of the match in 60th minutes as Khan Research Laboratories defeated Pakistan Navy 1–0. Rasool ended the season as the top-scorer of the league although Khan Research Laboratories finished third in the league. Rasool scored 3 goals in 6 matches in the 2009 National Challenge Cup, as he won his first silverware after Khan Research Laboratories defeated Pakistan Airlines 1–0 in the finals.

International
Rasool got his first senior cap against Jordan in 2007 AFC Asian Cup qualifications in 3–0 loss. Rasool was part of the national team that defeated Guam 9–2 in 2008 AFC Challenge Cup qualification. Rasool's last appearance was against Bangladesh in 2014 FIFA World Cup qualifications.

Career statistics

Club career

Goals for senior national team

Honours
Khan Research Laboratories
 National Football Challenge Cup: 2009

K-Electric
 Pakistan Premier League: 2014–15

Individual
 Pakistan Premier League Golden Boot: 2008–09, 2014–15
 Geo Football Super League Golden Boot: 2010

References

External links

1985 births
Living people
Khan Research Laboratories F.C. players
K-Electric F.C. players
Pakistani footballers
Pakistan international footballers
People from Chitral District
Association football forwards
Footballers at the 2006 Asian Games
Asian Games competitors for Pakistan